The 2022 Kilkenny Premier Junior Hurling Championship was the inaugural staging of the Kilkenny Premier Junior Hurling Championship and the 112th staging overall of a championship for the junior-ranking hurling teams in Kilkenny. The championship draw took place on 27 February 2022. The championship ran from 17 September to 23 October 2022.

The final was played on 23 October 2022 at UPMC Nowlan Park in Kilkenny, between Blacks and Whites and Windgap, in what was their first ever meeting in the final. Blacks and Whites won the match by 1-17 to 0-17 to claim their fourth championship title overall and a first title in 13 years.

Team changes

To Championship

Relegated from the Kilkenny Intermediate Hurling Championship
 John Locke's

From Championship

Promoted to the Kilkenny Intermediate Hurling Championship
 Mooncoin

Results

Semi-finals

Final

References

External link

 Kilkenny GAA website

Kilkenny Premier Junior Hurling Championship